Weinberg is a German and Jewish-Ashkenazi surname which means vineyard in German. Spellings in other languages include Wainberg, Vainberg, Vaynberg, Вайнберг and Wajnberg.

Weinberg may refer to:

 Abraham Weinberg (1897–1935), US Mobster
 Adam S. Weinberg, president of Denison University
 Albert Weinberg :fr:Albert Weinberg (1922–  2011), Belgian comics artist
 Alvin M. Weinberg (1915 –  2006), nuclear physicist and administrator of Manhattan Project
 Binyamin Weinberg (fl. 1972 –  1984), Israeli footballer
 Brenda Dickson-Weinberg (born 1949), American soap opera actress
 Denah Weinberg, Jerusalem rebbetzin and educator; widow of Noah Weinberg
 Erick Weinberg (born 1947), theoretical physicist  at Columbia University
 George Weinberg (disambiguation)
George Weinberg (mobster) (1901–1939), New York mobster and brother of Abraham Weinberg
George Weinberg (psychologist) (1929–2017), American psychologist, author and gay activist
 Gerald Weinberg (1933 –2018), US computer scientist
 Gerhard Weinberg (b. 1928), German-born US World War II historian
 Gladys Davidson Weinberg (1909-2002), American archaeologist
 Gus Weinberg (c. 1865–1952), actor, writer, and composer appearing in early-twentieth-century American films
 Harald Weinberg (born 1957), German politician (The Left)
 Harry Weinberg (1908–1990), Galicia-born US businessman and philanthropist; founder of Harry and Jeanette Weinberg Foundation
 Howie Weinberg (fl. 2011) US music mastering engineer
 Ian Weinberg, former professional soccer player
 Inés Mónica Weinberg de Roca (b 1948), Argentine judge on Buenes Aires Supreme Court and at UN
 Jay Weinberg, drummer and son of Max Weinberg
 Jeanette Weinberg (1910–1989), philanthropist
 Larry Weinberg (1926–2019), American real estate developer and sports owner
 Loretta Weinberg (born 1935), US politician and New Jersey State Senator
 Marcus Weinberg (born 1967), German politician
 Mark Weinberg (born 1931), South African born British financier
 Mark Weinberg (judge) (born 1948), Australian lawyer and judge
 Martin S. Weinberg (born 1939), US sociologist and sex researcher
 Max Weinberg, drummer and founder of Jimmy Vivino and the Basic Cable Band, originally known as  The Max Weinberg 7
 Michel Weinberg, Russian-born French physician and biologist 
 Mieczysław Weinberg or Moishe Vainberg (1919 – 1996), Polish-born Russian composer
 Moshe Weinberg (1939–1972), Israeli Olympic wrestling coach murdered in the Munich massacre
 Noah Weinberg (1930–2009), Orthodox Jewish rabbi and founder of Aish HaTorah.
 Peter Weinberg (born c. 1957), US businessman
 Richard Weinberg, Czechoslovakian/American art collector
 Richard A. Weinberg, American developmental psychologist
 Robert Weinberg, cancer biologist
 Ronald Weinberg Canadian former television producer and businessman
 Samantha Weinberg (fl. 1994-),  British novelist, journalist, travel writer, and Green Party politician under her married name Samantha Fletcher, Green Party politician
 Serge Weinberg, French businessman
 Sidney Weinberg (1891 – 1969), long-time leader of Goldman Sachs
 Shraga Weinberg (born 1966), Israeli wheelchair tennis player
 Steve Wynn, born Weinberg
 Steven Weinberg (1933–2021), American Nobel Prize–winning physicist
 Wendy Weinberg, American Olympic medalist swimmer
 Wilhelm Weinberg, German physician and geneticist
 Yaakov Weinberg (1923–1999), Canadian Rosh Yeshiva
 Yechiel Yaakov Weinberg (1884–1966), Polish Orthodox rabbi
 Zygfryd Weinberg, Polish athlete

See also
 Weinberg (disambiguation)
 Mark Wainberg (born 1945 –  2017)), Canadian HIV/AIDS researcher and  activist. 
 Vainberg, surname
 Weinberger, surname

German-language surnames
Jewish surnames
Yiddish-language surnames